The Ford Model TT is a truck made by Ford.

Production
When the first three units were produced in 1917, the Model TT was sold as a chassis with the buyer supplying a body. The price was $600.  Starting in 1924, the truck was available with a factory-produced body. By 1926 the price had dropped to $325. In 1925, a hand-operated windshield wiper was added.

Military production
In his World Encyclopedia of Military Vehicles, author Pat Ware writes that: "During World War I, the Model T was ... standardized in the "light" class. The first truck, using a long-wheelbase chassis designated Model TT, was launched in 1917. Although Ford ... was a pacifist, he was ... happy to supply the US Army with more than 12,000 of these vehicles,..." and: "There was no civilian production of the Model Ts between 1917 and 1918."

Further on, Ware writes: "The Model T was widely used by the US and British armies during World War I as a staff car, ambulance, van and cargo truck, even as an artillery tractor, for which application the truck was fitted with twinned rear tyres." Many remained in service into the 1930s.

Below are the numbers of Model T trucks produced each year, not including Canadian production.

Drivetrain

The rear axle of the TT has a worm drive and crown wheel, unlike the Model T's crown wheel and pinion. The worm is located at the end of the drive shaft and above the crown wheel.

The Model TT was very durable for the time, but slow when compared to other trucks. Standard worm gear ratio is 7.25:1, and special gearing gives a ratio of 5.17:1. Because of this, accessory catalogs offered items to help give the Model TT more power.

It was replaced by the Ford Model AA truck in 1928.

References

Bibliography

External links
 Ford Model TT brochure from 1923

Model TT
Motor vehicles manufactured in the United States
Vehicles introduced in 1917